Muzaffer Tekin (28 October 1950, in Çankırı – 1 April 2015) is a former member of Turkey's Special Warfare Department, and a suspect in the Ergenekon trials as well as the Turkish Council of State shooting. In August 2013 Tekin was sentenced to consecutive life sentences.

Career
Tekin graduated from the Turkish Military Academy in 1972, where he had been a classmate of Cem Ersever, and served in the Special Warfare Department. He participated in the Turkish invasion of Cyprus, and according to Oktay Yıldırım was "the only lieutenant who ever received a gold medal for his work in the Cyprus Peace Operation". He was forced to retire in 1986, having reached the rank of captain, due to a Supreme Military Council (YAŞ) decision in relation to a fight Tekin was involved in. In 2007 he said that he had served in the armed forces together with Oktay Yıldırım, and said that Yıldırım was "like my son".

Tekin was a partner in finance company Doğuş Factoring, in which Turkish Council of State shooter Alparslan Arslan worked as a lawyer. In 2007 Sabah published claims, which it said were based on German police reports, that Doğuş Factoring had been used to launder drug money, and that Tekin was the lead organiser of the drug operations.

Trials
Days after the Turkish Council of State shooting, the National Intelligence Organization (MIT) and police intelligence said they had had Tekin under surveillance for six months as part of an investigation into the Vatansever Kuvvetler Güç Birliği Hareketi.

On 5 August 2013 Tekin was sentenced to consecutive life sentences.

On March 10, 2014 upper courts determined that the rulings made in the Ergenekon case were improper and therefore released all prisoners. Since all these cases were proven to be a set up against the Turkish military forces with the intent to weaken them. https://www.reuters.com/article/us-turkey-ergenekon-idUSBREA291GB20140310

References

External links
Dön dolaş aynı isimler: 'Tekin'e komutan derlerdi'  - links with Semih Tufan Gülaltay
Council of State investigation leads to 'deep' facts - links with İbrahim Şahin and Veli Küçük

1950 births
2015 deaths
People from Çankırı
Special Warfare Department personnel
Prisoners and detainees of Turkey
Turkish Military Academy alumni
People convicted in the Ergenekon trials
Prisoners sentenced to life imprisonment by Turkey
Deaths from cancer in Turkey
Deaths from pancreatic cancer
Turkish Council of State shooting
Burials at Karacaahmet Cemetery
Turkish military personnel of the Cyprus conflicts